Blue Jam was an ambient, surreal dark comedy and horror radio programme created and directed by Chris Morris. It was broadcast on BBC Radio 1 in the early hours of the morning, for three series from 1997 to 1999.

The programme gained cult status due to its unique mix of surreal monologue, ambient soundtrack, synthesised voices, heavily edited broadcasts and recurring sketches. It featured vocal performances of Kevin Eldon, Julia Davis, Mark Heap, David Cann and Amelia Bullmore, with Morris himself delivering disturbing monologues, one of which was revamped and made into the BAFTA-winning short film My Wrongs #8245–8249 & 117. Writers who contributed to the programme included Graham Linehan, Arthur Mathews, Peter Baynham, David Quantick, Jane Bussmann, Robert Katz and the cast.

The programme was adapted into the TV series Jam, which aired in 2000. All episodes of Blue Jam are currently available for streaming and download on the Internet Archive and Youtube.

Production 

On his inspiration for making the show, Morris commented: "It was so singular, and it came from a mood, quite a desolate mood. I had this misty, autumnal, boggy mood anyway, so I just went with that. But no doubt getting to the end of something like Brass Eye, where you've been forced to be a sort of surrogate lawyer, well, that's the most creatively stifling thing you could possibly do." Morris also described the show as being "like the nightmares you have when you fall asleep listening to the BBC World Service" (a reference to the World Service also appears in one of the monologues read by Morris).

Morris originally requested that the show be broadcast at 3 a.m. on Radio 1 "because at that hour, on insomniac radio, the amplitude of terrible things is enormously overblown". As a compromise, the show was broadcast at midnight without much promotion. Morris reportedly included sketches too graphic or transgressive for radio that he knew would be cut so as to make his other material seem less transgressive in comparison. During the airing of episode 6 of series one, a re-editing of the Archbishop of Canterbury's speech at Princess Diana's funeral was deemed too offensive for broadcast, and was switched with a different episode as it aired.

Format and style

Each episode opened (and closed) with a short spoken monologue (delivered by Morris) describing, in surreal, broken language, various bizarre feelings and situations (for example: "when you sick so sad you cry, and in crying cry a whole leopard from your eye"), set to ambient music interspersed with short clips of other songs and sounds. The introduction would always end with "welcome in Blue Jam", inviting the listener, who is presumably experiencing such feelings, to get lost in the program. (This format was replicated in the television adaptation Jam, often reusing opening monologues from series 3 of the radio series.) The sketches within dealt with heavy and taboo topics, such as murder, suicide, missing or dead children, and rape.

Common recurring sketches
Doctor (played by David Cann): "The Doctor" is a seemingly "normal" physician working in a standard British medical practice. However, he has a habit of treating his patients in bizarre and often disturbing ways, such as prescribing heroin for a cold, kissing patients on various body parts to make swellings go away, making a man with a headache jump up and down to make his penis swing (while mirroring the patient's bewildered jumping himself) and making a patient leave and go into the next room so he can examine him over the telephone. His name is revealed to be Michael Perlin in several sketches.
The Monologue Man (played by Chris Morris): Short stories, often up to 10 minutes in length, written from the perspective of a lonely and socially inept man. Each story usually involves the protagonist's acquaintance Suzy in some capacity.
Michael Alexander St. John: A parody of hyperbolic and pun-laden radio presenting, St. John presents items such as the top 10 singles charts and the weekend's gigs.
Bad Sex: Short clips of two lovers (played by Julia Davis and Kevin Eldon) making increasingly bizarre erotic requests of one another, such as to "shit your leg off" and "make your spunk come out green".
The Interviewer (played by Chris Morris): conducting real interviews with celebrities such as Andrew Morton and Jerry Springer, Morris confuses and mocks his subjects with ambiguous and odd questions.
Mr. Ventham (played by Mark Heap): An extremely awkward man who requires one-to-one consultations with Mr. Reilly (played by David Cann), who seems to be his psychologist, for the most banal of matters.

The sketches not listed are often in the style of a documentary; characters speak as if being interviewed about a recent event. In one sketch, a character voiced by Morris describes a man attempting to commit suicide by jumping off a second-story balcony repeatedly; in another, an angry man (Eldon) shouts about how his car, after being picked up from the garage, is only four feet long.

Radio stings
Morris included a series of 'radio stings', bizarre sequences of sounds and prose as a parody of modern DJs' own soundbites and self-advertising pieces. Each one revolves around a contemporary DJ, such as Chris Moyles, Jo Whiley and Mark Goodier, typically involving each DJ dying in a graphic way or going mad in some form – for example, Chris Moyles covering himself in jam and hanging himself from the top of a building.

Episodes

Three series were produced, with a total of eighteen episodes. All episodes were originally broadcast weekly on BBC Radio 1. Series 1 was broadcast from 14 November to 19 December 1997; series 2 was broadcast from 27 March to 1 May 1998; and series 3 broadcast from 21 January to 25 February 1999.

Series 1 – (Fridays) 14 November 1997 to 19 December 1997, from 00:00 to 01:00.
Series 2 – (Fridays) 27 March 1998 to 1 May 1998, from 01:00 to 02:00.
Series 3 – (Thursdays) 21 January 1999 to 25 February 1999, from 00:00 to 01:00.

The first five episodes of series 1 of Blue Jam were repeated by BBC Radio 4 Extra in February and March 2014, and series 2 was rebroadcast in December.

Music 

Blue Jam features songs, generally of a downtempo nature, interspersed between (and sometimes during) sketches. Artists featured includes Massive Attack, Air, Morcheeba, The Chemical Brothers, Björk, Aphex Twin, Everything But the Girl and Dimitri from Paris, as well as various non-electronic artists including Sly and the Family Stone, Serge Gainsbourg, The Cardigans and Eels.

Reception 

Blue Jam was favourably reviewed on several occasions by The Guardian and also received a positive review by The Independent.

Digital Spy wrote in 2014: "It's a heady cocktail that provokes an odd, unsettling reaction in the listener, yet Blue Jam is still thumpingly and frequently laugh-out-loud hilarious." Hot Press called it "as odd as comedy gets".

CD release 
A CD of a number of Blue Jam sketches was released on 23 October 2000 by record label Warp. Although the CD claims to have 22 tracks, the last one, "www.bishopslips.com", is not a track, but rather a reference to the "Bishopslips" sketch, which was cut in the middle of a broadcast. Most of the sketches on the CD were remade for Jam.

 Track listing

 "Blue Jam Intro"
 "Doc Phone"
 "Lamacq sting"
 "4 ft Car"
 "Suicide Journalist"
 "Acupuncture"
 "Bad Sex"
 "Mayo Sting"
 "Unflustered Parents"
 "Moyles Sting"
 "TV Lizards"
 "Doc Cock"
 "Hobbs Sting"
 "Morton Interview"
 "Fix It Girl"
 "Porn"
 "Kids Party"
 "Club News"
 "Whiley Sting"
 "Little Girl Balls"
 "Blue Jam Outro"
 "www.bishopslips.com" (not a real track)

Related shows

Blue Jam was later made for television and broadcast on Channel 4 as Jam. It used unusual editing techniques to achieve an unnerving ambience in keeping with the radio show. Many of the sketches were lifted from the radio version, even to the extent of simply setting images to the radio soundtrack. A subsequent "re-mixed" airing, called Jaaaaam was even more extreme in its use of post-production gadgetry, often heavily distorting the footage.

Blue Jam shares parallels with early editions of a US public radio show Joe Frank: Work in Progress from the mid-1980s, that Joe Frank did on the NPR affiliate station, KCRW, in Santa Monica, California.

References

External links
 
Blue Jam on the BBC Comedy site
 – repeats on BBC Radio 4 Extra

1997 radio programme debuts
BBC Radio comedy programmes